The Festival du Film Merveilleux is an international film festival held in Paris, focusing on themes of magic and fantasy. It was started by Benedicte Beaugeois and Maureen Gerby. It is organized in conjunction with the Talulah Association, an organizer of short and feature film events in Paris, as well as workshops on film and ecological awareness. It was first organized in 2010.

Festivals

24–27 March 2010
 Jury : Nicolas Bary, Olivier Lliboutry, Lydia Tassier, Philippe Vidal and Williams Crépin 
Best Movie : "Le Portail" directed by Liam Engle (Black Bird production and ASM)
Best animated movie : "Fard" directed by David Alapont and Luis Briceno (Metronomic animation)
Best screenplay : "Salut Peter" written by  Jean Vocat, directed by Jules Thénier (AQRM Production)
Special Prize  : "Raging Ball" directed by Nicolas Duval (Padma Production)
Best Pick : "Homeland de Juan'' directed by Dios Marfil Atienza (FAMU Production)
Prix du Public (the People's Choice) : "Salut Peter"

30 June--2 July 2011
Held at the Théâtre douze, 6 avenue Maurice Ravel, Pari'

Jury: Xavier Gens, Caroline Vié, Nicolas Alberny, Fabrice Joubert

Prize Festival  2011 
Best Movie : Planet Z directed by Momoko Seto
Best animated movie : le silence sous l’ecorce  directed by  Joanna Lurie
Best Screenplay : Junk directed by Kirk Hendry
Special Prize : A morning Stroll directed by Grant Orchard
Best music pick : Junk directed by Kirk Hendry

28–30 June 2012
Held at the Théâtre douze, 6 avenue Maurice Ravel, Paris
Best Movie :Second seuil directed by  Loïc Nicoloff produce by  Tita production et Zoïc production, FRANCE
Best animated movie : A shadow of blue directed by Carlos Lascano produce by les films du Cygne,  Animation,  FRANCE / SPAIN
Best screenplay : Flejos y reflejos directed by  Rioberto Lopez produce by escalando, SPAIN
Special Prize : Demain c'est la fin du monde directed by Quentin Reynaud and Arthur Delaire produce by  Magali film,  FRANCE
Music pick : Hasaki ya suda de Cedric ido,  composers: Nicolas Tescari and  David Chalmin, produce  by DACP films, FRANCE
Jury prize : Citrouille et vieilles dentelles directed by Juliette Loubieres, JPL films, Animation FRANCE / CANADA
Best actress : Leticia Dolera ,  Fabrica de Munecas  directed by  Ainhoa Menéndez Goyoaga produit par Jaime Bartolomé PC, ESPAGNE
Best actor : Niels Lucas, L'enclume directed by  Thierry Nevez, produce by ASM,  FRANCE

27–29 June 2013
Held at the Théâtre douze, 6 avenue Maurice Ravel, Paris
Best Movies :  SLEEPWORKING directed by Gavin Williams (also won Quiet Earth Prize) 
Jury Prize : MORT D'UNE OMBRE directed by Tom Van Avermaet 
Best animated movie ex aequo : LUMINARIS directed by Juan Pablo Zaramella and MILLE PATTES ET CRAPAUD directed by Anna Kmelevskaya 
Music pick :  LUMINARIS directed by Juan Pablo Zaramella 
best screenplay : SUNSET DAY directed by J.A. Duran
Jury : Patrick Amsom, Camille Solal,James BKS, Isabelle Doll, Florent Lamy, Isabelle Duval, Fouad Benhammou,Xavier Laurent

26–28 June 2014
Strange Fruit directed Noy Hili et Aresay Shimi : BEST MOVIE
Dji death fails directed by Dimitri Voloshin BEST ANIMATED MOVIES 
La maison de poussière directed byt Jean-Claude Rozec BEST SCREENPLAY
Tears of steel directed by Ian Hubert MUSIC PICK 
Lila directed by Carlos Lascano SPECIAL PRIZE 
Mention spéciale for La petite casserole d’Anatole directed by  Eric Montchaud (France)

References

External links
 Festival du film Merveilleux Website

Film festivals in Paris